Alpha is an unincorporated community in Clinton County, Kentucky, United States. It lies along Route 90 northeast of the city of Albany, the county seat of Clinton County. It has a post office with the ZIP code 42603.

The name comes from Alpha E. Davis, the community's second postmaster.

References

Unincorporated communities in Clinton County, Kentucky
Unincorporated communities in Kentucky